Fits is White Denim's second LP on European label Full Time Hobby Records, following up the critically acclaimed releases of 2008's EU debut Workout Holiday and US debut Exposion. The band's third full-length album was released in Europe on June 22, 2009, and was released in the United States on October 20, 2009, on Downtown Records.

Prior to the album's release, on April 24, 2009, NME posted the song "Mirrored and Reverse" on their website, giving fans their first taste of Fits. On June 8, 2009, Dallas-based music blog Gorilla vs. Bear released the song "I Start To Run." A week before the album's official release, NME allowed readers to stream the entire album via their website.

Track listing

The album was later repackaged by Downtown Records as a 2 disc set with the U.S.-only album Exposion.

Videos
 Official video posted by Full Time Hobby Records, directed by Tom Haines.

Personnel
James Petralli – vocals, guitar
Joshua Block – drums
Steve Terebecki – vocals, bass

References

External links
RCRD LBL website: RCRD LBL EP is available for free download.
Daytrotter Session: Four free songs for download
NME Exclusive: Download Mp3 of "Mirrored and Reverse"

2009 albums
White Denim albums
Downtown Records albums
Full Time Hobby albums